Nathan Elams Cockrell (September 27, 1833 – June 3, 1859) was a founder of the Sigma Alpha Epsilon fraternity.

Early life
Nathan Elams Cockrell was born on September 27, 1833 in Livingston, Alabama. His father was Dempsey Cockrell and his mother, Millicent Carpenter. His maternal uncle, Captain Nathan Mullin Carpenter, was the owner of the Everhope Plantation in Eutaw, Alabama.

He attended the University of Alabama, where he was a founding member of Sigma Alpha Epsilon. He graduated in 1856.

Career
Cockrell managed his father's plantation.  Later, he became the editor of the Livingston Messenger newspaper.

Death
Cockrell died on June 3, 1859.

References

1833 births
1859 deaths
American newspaper editors
People from Livingston, Alabama
19th-century American journalists
American male journalists
Sigma Alpha Epsilon founders
Journalists from Alabama
19th-century American male writers